This is a list of lighthouses in Romania.

Lighthouses

See also
 Lists of lighthouses and lightvessels

References

External links

 DIRECŢIA HIDROGRAFICĂ MARITIMĂ
 

Romania
Lighthouses
Lighthouses
Lighthouses
Romania
Lighthouses in Romania